Mairon César Reis or simply Marinho (born 27 August 1979 in Belo Horizonte), is a Brazilian striker. He currently plays for Guarani in Minas Gerais.

Honours
Minas Gerais Cup: 2004
Minas Gerais State League: 2005
Brazilian League (2nd division): 2006
Campeão Mineiro: 2007

Contract
8 October 2006 to 31 December 2008

External links
 sambafoot
 zerozero.pt
 placar
 CBF
 Guardian Stats Centre
 atletico.com.br

1979 births
Living people
Brazilian footballers
Brazilian expatriate footballers
Ipatinga Futebol Clube players
Expatriate footballers in Sweden
Hammarby Fotboll players
Esporte Clube Juventude players
Clube Atlético Mineiro players
Cruzeiro Esporte Clube players
Villa Nova Atlético Clube players
Clube de Regatas Brasil players
Association football forwards
Footballers from Belo Horizonte